Skuruhatt is a steep hilltop near Skurugata in Eksjö Municipality in southern Sweden, with expansive views of the interior of Småland. Nearby a stone has been placed with the following Swedish inscription by Albert Engström.

Folket som bor i dessa gårdar torde vara av renaste guld -- dessa sega magra arbetare som brottas med sin fattiga jord och segra, segra är det icke ett folk att hålla av.Albert Engström

References

Hills of Sweden
Småland
Landforms of Jönköping County